Mohsen Medhat Warda (born 1 November 1955) is an Egyptian basketball player. He competed in the men's tournament at the 1984 Summer Olympics. He was inducted into the FIBA Hall of Fame in 2019.

References

External links
 

1955 births
Living people
Basketball players at the 1984 Summer Olympics
Egyptian men's basketball players
FIBA Hall of Fame inductees
Olympic basketball players of Egypt
Place of birth missing (living people)